A referendum on stamp duty was held in Switzerland on 13 May 1917. Voters were asked whether they approved of amending articles 41bis and 42 lit d of the constitution, which covered stamp duty. The proposal was approved by a majority of voters and cantons.

Background
The referendum was a mandatory referendum, which required a double majority; a majority of the popular vote and majority of the cantons. The decision of each canton was based on the vote in that canton. Full cantons counted as one vote, whilst half cantons counted as half.

Results

References

1917 referendums
1917 in Switzerland
Referendums in Switzerland
Tax reform referendums